Oleg Aleksandrovich Smirnov (born 2 January 1964) is a Russian retired professional footballer. He made his professional debut in the Soviet Top League in 1982 for FC Spartak Moscow.

Honours
 Soviet Top League runner-up: 1983.
 Soviet Top League bronze: 1982.

References

1964 births
People from Pushkino
Living people
Soviet footballers
Russian footballers
Russian Premier League players
Soviet Top League players
FC Spartak Moscow players
FC Asmaral Moscow players
FC Rotor Volgograd players
FC Energiya Volzhsky players
FC Shinnik Yaroslavl players
Association football midfielders
FC Lukhovitsy players
Sportspeople from Moscow Oblast